Kim Joon (born Kim Byung-gong on May 12, 2014) is a South Korean actor and model. He is known for his role as Jo Jung-suk's son, Lee Woo-joo in Hospital Playlist. He began his career as a child actor when he was still 5 years old in 1st grade of Elementary school following his older brother, Kim Yool.

Filmography

Television series

Film

References

External links
 
 
 

2014 births
Living people
South Korean male film actors
South Korean male television actors
South Korean male child actors
21st-century South Korean male actors
People from Daejeon